Hrpelje (in older sources Herpelje) is a settlement in the Municipality of Hrpelje-Kozina in the Littoral region of Slovenia. It is the administrative center of the municipality.

Name
Hrpelje was attested in historical sources as Herpelie and Herpelye in 1763–1787. The name may be derived from the plural demonym *Vьrpeľane based on the common noun *vьrpa 'sinkhole', thus originally meaning 'people living near a sinkhole'. If so, the initial H- is prothetic.

Church
The parish church in the settlement is dedicated to Saint Anthony the Hermit and belongs to the Koper Diocese.

References

External links

Hrpelje on Geopedia

Populated places in the Municipality of Hrpelje-Kozina